Senait is an African given name. Notable people with the name include:

Senait Ashenafi (born 1966), Ethiopian-born actress
Senait Fisseha (born 1971), Ethiopian endocrinologist 
Senait Ghebrehiwet Mehari, Eritrean-born German singer

African given names